Karen Kilgariff (born May 11, 1970 in Petaluma, California) is an American writer, comedian, singer, author, actress, television producer, and podcast host. She began her career as a stand up comedian in the early 1990s and later became a television actress, most notably as a cast member on Mr. Show. She has written for many comedy television shows, including being the head writer on The Rosie Show, The Ellen Degeneres Show and The Pete Holmes Show.

Since 2016 she has co-hosted the true crime comedy podcast My Favorite Murder along with Georgia Hardstark. In 2018, she and Hardstark co-founded the podcast network Exactly Right. Along with Hardstark, Kilgariff wrote the non-fiction book Stay Sexy and Don't Get Murdered, which was released on May 28, 2019.

Early life
Karen Kilgariff grew up outside Petaluma, California with her mother, Patricia (née Knight) who died in 2016, her father Jim, and an older sister. Both of Karen's parents worked; her father was a San Francisco firefighter and her mother was a head psychiatric nurse at the Langley Porter Psychiatric Institute. She attended St. Vincent de Paul High School in Petaluma.

Career

Stand up and acting
Karen Kilgariff started out as a stand-up comedian in Sacramento in the 1990s. She went on to land comedy roles on television, including being a cast member on seasons 3 and 4 of Mr. Show. She would later appear in the 2015 reboot, W/ Bob & David, as well. She played the role of Jean Pettengill for five episodes of The Book Group in 2003.

In 2015, Kilgariff teamed up with Drennon Davis to record a live album of comedy songs titled I Don't Care, I Like It.

Writing career
In 2003 Kilgariff was hired by Ellen DeGeneres to help write for her comedy special, Ellen DeGeneres: Here and Now. Kilgariff later toured with DeGeneres as her opening act. Kilgariff was then named head writer for the day time talk show The Ellen DeGeneres Show, which launched in September 2003. She occasionally appeared on screen in sketches and other segments. She was also part of a comic duo (with Mary Lynn Rajskub) called Girls Guitar Club.

Kilgariff served as the head writer for The Rosie Show, which aired on the Oprah Winfrey Network. She later served as the head writer for The Pete Holmes Show, which aired on TBS.

She also wrote for and starred in truTV's Talk Show: The Game Show and produced Making History on FOX Broadcasting Company.

Kilgariff wrote four episodes for FX’s comedy-drama Baskets between 2017 and 2019.

Podcast hosting
In 2014, Kilgariff started a podcast with comedian Chris Fairbanks called Do You Need A Ride?.
The podcast originally took place entirely in a car, where Karen and Chris would speak to their guest while driving around. Citing safety concerns, however, they now occasionally record at the Exactly Right Studios.
In 2016, Kilgariff and Georgia Hardstark started the true-crime podcast My Favorite Murder, in which they discuss various infamous murders and serial killers. Since its inception, the podcast has garnered a large fan base, totaling over 19 million listeners. They have also toured the United States and internationally performing My Favorite Murder live shows. In 2018 she and Hardstark co-founded the podcast network Exactly Right, which now produces their podcast along with ten others. In April 2019, the network's first original podcast Jensen and Holes: The Murder Squad debuted at number one.

In 2019, Kilgariff and Hardstark published Stay Sexy and Don't Get Murdered, a joint memoir.

Personal life
Kilgariff does not drink alcohol, and has been open about her past struggles with abuse of amphetamines and diet pills. In an interview with Marc Maron for his WTF podcast, she said she stopped using drugs and alcohol completely after she began having seizures, fearing her drug use had been the cause. Karen now lives in Studio City, California with her dogs, Frank and Blossom. Kilgariff married at age 32 and is now divorced.

Discography
In 2014, Kilgariff recorded a musical comedy album Live at the Bootleg.

References

External links 
 
 
 "In 'Bootleg,' Kilgariff Sets Her Comic Commentary To Music" on National Public Radio
 "10 Weird Questions with Karen Kilgariff" from Man Cave Daily
 Interview with Karen Kilgariff in Nailed
 My Favorite Murder on Midroll

Living people
1970 births
21st-century American comedians
21st-century American women
American sketch comedians
American women comedians
American women writers
Comedians from California
People associated with true crime
People from Petaluma, California
Writers from California